Filipina singer Nina has received and collected many honors and awards throughout her career. Four of her major achievements include: Wave 89.1 Urban Music Awards' Special Achievement Award, ASAP Platinum Circle Awards' Elite Platinum Circle Award, Awit Award and MTV Pilipinas Music Award for Favorite New Artist. Throughout her career, she has won ten Awit Awards, two Aliw Awards, two Myx Music Awards and one PMPC Star Award for Music among numerous others. Domestically, she was named as the best-selling female recording artist of 2009 by the Box Office Entertainment Awards with accumulated 100,000 record sales for the year.

Her album Nina Live! is the fourth best-selling certified album, best-selling live album and best-selling album of the 2000s in the Philippines, making Nina the third artist, first female, to receive a diamond certification by the PARI. She has spent a total of 37 weeks at the number-one position in Philippine charts from 2003 to 2006. Her songs "Jealous", "Foolish Heart" and "Make You Mine" topped the Philippine charts in 2003, making her the first female OPM artist to have three number-one singles on a single calendar year. Her hit single "Love Moves in Mysterious Ways" held the record for longest running number-one OPM song, spending twelve consecutive weeks atop the Philippine charts in 2005. Her single "Araw Mo" is the first original birthday song and ringtone by an OPM artist that became a moderate hit. Despite not having released new material since 2013, she was ranked at number 8 and 5 on Spotify's most-streamed female OPM artists of 2018 and 2020, respectively, with an average of 963,468 monthly listeners.

Despite music being her primary source of accomplishment, Nina has earned recognition through televised dance competitions. On December 2, 2007, Nina was declared Monthly Champion on ABC-5's Shall We Dance? when she performed a freestyle-jive with professional ballroom dancer Efren Ibo. On January 18, 2009, she was recognized as Daily Winner on ABS-CBN's Magpasikat, a temporary replacement after the suspension of the noontime variety show Showtime, after performing a group dance with the G-Force.

2003

2004

2005

2006

2007

2008

2009

2010

2011

2012

2013

2014

Other notable awards

Awit Awards History

References

External links
 Nina's Awards
 Awit Awards Nominees and Winners

Nina Girado
Philippine music-related lists
Nina

de:Nina Girado
es:Nina Girado